Skranta is a district in Karlskoga, Sweden. The area was largely developed in the mid-1900s, with the building of a number of apartment blocks. In the 1900s the shopping centre  was built, consisting of small number of shops, along with a small supermarket, and a hair salon. The area is largely residential, though broken up by green spaces and offices. Previously, there was an elementary and middle school in Skranta, but today there is only a high school.

In popular culture 
Mia Skäringer's character Tabita on Skrantabacken, portrayed a humorous stereotype of a suburban mom in Skranta.

In 2016, a Skranta documentary series called "Skolpojkarna" was aired on SVT1 and UR Play. The series aimed to highlight the reasons why boys performed worse than girls in school.

References

Literature 

 
  
 

Karlskoga